Max Wylie Kroger (14 March 1899 – 3 April 1989) was an Australian rules footballer who played with Geelong in the Victorian Football League (VFL).

An all-round sportsman, Kroger won the decathlon and came second in the pole vault at the 1926 Australasian championships.

Notes

External links 
 
 
 Max Kroger at Australian Athletics Historical Results

1899 births
1989 deaths
Australian rules footballers from Victoria (Australia)
Australian decathletes
Australian male pole vaulters
Geelong Football Club players
20th-century Australian people